is a motorway in western Germany, connecting Brühl to the A 1, partially replacing the Bundesstraße 51.

Exit list 

 (Südteil)

|toward Köln
|}

External links 

553
A553